Kenneth Wallis (born 1943) is a former Hong Kong international lawn bowler and footballer.

Bowls career
He won a bronze medal in the singles at the 1994 Commonwealth Games in Canada. In addition he competed in the fours at the 1990 Commonwealth Games.

He won two medals at the Asia Pacific Bowls Championships.

Football career
He was a member of the Hong Kong squad and played in the 1965 and 1966 Merdeka Cup.

Personal life
He moved to Hong Kong from Britain in 1962 to join the Royal Hong Kong Police Force. He married Jenny Wallis and they moved to Australia when Jenny was appointed director of the Hong Kong Economic & Trade Office in Sydney.

References

Hong Kong male bowls players
Living people
1943 births
Commonwealth Games medallists in lawn bowls
Commonwealth Games bronze medallists for Hong Kong
Bowls players at the 1994 Commonwealth Games
Medallists at the 1994 Commonwealth Games